TurnOn is a single-player video game developed by Brainy Studio LLC. 1st demo episode was launched on Windows Phone, Xbox One (as a member of ID@Xbox) and Steam (got Greenlit April 17, 2015) will get a full version of the game on June 1, 2016. The main character is an alien electrical spark named Turnon, which should return the electricity to the unexpectedly de-energized city. The game has a distinctive visual style and graphics, as well as the original story, became the second big project of Brainy Studio after WitchCraft, creating on Unity3D. In 2014 a prototype of TurnOn became the winner in the "Games" category in the world's largest technology competition,  Imagine Cup 2014, held under the auspices Microsoft, and also became a participant of the biggest in the world support program for mobile apps and games developers, AppCampus.

The first of five announced episodes was launched at the beginning of 2015, later developers started Steam Greenlight campaign.

Gameplay
The plot revolves around a small spark named Turnon, an alien space object, which flew through the atmosphere and accidentally hit in the city's power station, where it came alive from the strong impact of the current and became a rational being. As a result of the accident the city remains without electricity, and now Turnon looks like a fireball with a pretty face, has to return the light back into the homes of citizens. Turnon strolls through the suburban areas, has fun at school parties and repairs the wiring in a private house visits the power station and restores the observatory, as well as fights with unexpected enemies.

Professor Brain, a scientist from the power station, found Turnon at the time of the accident and decided to help him. Using minibus equipped with an electric generator, they move around the city from one district to another and restore the power supply.

TurnOn has five episodes, where players explore the city and turn on the light everywhere it's possible or planned by the plot. There are two types of levels:

 Exploration levels, where players have to restore the city's power station, help a little girl to get home, repair the wiring in the private cottage, throw a school party, then visit an observatory and run a dron. Every chapter has a lot of situations without electricity, which should be found and resolved.
 Music levels, where you can climb to the high-voltage wires and moving in the rhythm of the music, collect positive charges avoid negative ones.

References

External links
Official website
YouTube trailer on Xbox Channel
HonestGamers PC version Review
Review in Microsoft Blog
WMPoweruser review
Lumia Conversation interview with developers
TurnOn in Xbox Store
TurnOn in Steam Store

2016 video games
Alien invasions in video games
Video games developed in Russia
Windows Phone games
Multiplayer and single-player video games
Adventure games
Indie video games
Platform games
Single-player video games
Windows games
Xbox One games